Babunski is Macedonian surname, a toponymic surname derived from the Babuna mountain near Veles. It was adopted as a surname by the descendants of Serbian Chetnik vojvoda Jovan Stojković, from his nom de guerre (or "Chetnik name") "Babunski". Jovan is the great-grandfather of Danijela Babunski,
footballer Boban Babunski, who in turn is the father of brothers David and Dorian. People with the surname include:

 Jovan Babunski (1878–1920), Macedonian Serb Chetnik leader
 Danijela Babunski, Serbian physiotherapist
 Boban Babunski, Macedonian footballer
 David Babunski, Macedonian footballer
 Dorian Babunski, Macedonian footballer

References

Macedonian-language surnames
Toponymic surnames